Amber Neilson (born 14 December 1984) is an Australian retired soccer player who played for Newcastle Jets in the Australian W-League.

Playing career

Club career
Neilson played for Newcastle Jets in the Australian W-League.

Neilson retired from football after the final game of the 2010–11 W-League season.

Before the 2014 season, Neilson came out of retirement, re-signing with Newcastle Jets. At the end of the season she returned to retirement.

International career

She played three matches at the 2002 FIFA U-19 Women's World Championship in Canada.

Neilson also represented Australia at senior international level.

References

External links
 

1984 births
Living people
Australian women's soccer players
Newcastle Jets FC (A-League Women) players
Australia women's international soccer players
Women's association football midfielders